Costa Rica became a member of the United Nations on November 2, 1945.

Delegations to the UN

1946 Delegation
In this first assembly, the Costa Rican Ambassador made not comments on the general themes of the discussion.

Chief of the Delegation: Fernando Soto Harrison

1947 Delegation
The Costa Rican delegation did not dance any general themes of discussion, and the General Assembly was focused on its future organization.

Delegates: Ricardo Fournier, Francisco de Paula Gutierrez, Arturo Morales Flores, Fernando Flores B., Miguel A. Blanco

1948 Delegation
The Costa Rican delegation did not any general themes of discussion, but they did remark on several aspects of the agenda. The most important points of discussion were the Palestine situation, problems with the Greek border, the situation in the Balkans, a temporary committee on the elections in South Korea, and the problem between Pakistan and India.

Delegates: Gonzalo Facio, Alberto Canas, Alfonso Goicoechea, Edmond Woodbridge, Alberto Lorenzo, Carlos Manuel Gutierrez, Gonzalo Ortiz Martin and Miguel Bourla

1949 Delegation
The major themes of this General Assembly were the crisis in the Middle East, the dispute between Pakistan and India, the necessity of establishing technical programs for countries in need, and the problems between Great Britain and Greece.

Delegates: Alfredo Volio Mata, Jorge Martinez Moreno, Fernando Pinto Echeverria, Romano Orlich, Graciela Morales de Echeverria

1950 Delegation
Delegates: Mario Echandi Jimenez, Luis Fernando Jimenez Mendez, Fernando Fournier Acuna, Manuel Freer Jimenez, Ruben Esquivel de la Guardia, Felix Roberto Cortes Noriega

1951 Delegation
Delegates: Alfredo Volio Mata, Fernando Pinto Echeverria

1952 Delegation
Delegates: Alfredo Volio Mata, Christian de Tattenbach, Fernando Hine, Gonzalo Facio, Fabio Fournier, Ruben Esquivel de la Guardia, and Mario Golcher

1953 Delegation
Delegates: Eladio Trejos Flores, C. Tattenbach, Carlos Jose Gutierrez, Ricardo Fernandez Palma, Ruben Esquivel de la Guardia, Manuel Fernandez, Roberto Fernandez Zuniga, Raul Trejos Flores, Efrain Alfaro, and Maria Lilia Favio

1954 Delegation
Delegates: Fernando Fournier, Benjamin Nunez, Elsa Orozco, Rodrigo Madrigal, Rafael Carrillo, Alberto Canas, Raul Trejos Flores, Jose F. Carvallo, Maria Lilia Montejo, Luis F. Jimenez

1955 Delegation
Delegates: Alfredo Volio Mata, Gonzalo Facio, Cristian de Tattenbach, Fernando Fournier, Maria Eugenia Vargas Solera, Roberto Fernandez Duran, Benjamin Nunez, Rodrigo Sotela Montagne, Oscar Chavez Esquivel, Roberto Loria Cortes, Francisco Carvallo Quiros, Rufino Gil and Raul Trejos Flores

1956 Delegation
Delegates: Raul Trejos Flores, Carlos Jose Gutierrez, Canas Escalante, Cristian de Tattenbach, G.J. Facio, and Roberto Fernandez

1957 Delegation
Ambassador Fournier proposed in this session that the UN define the concept of aggression.

Delegates: Fournier Acuna, Canas Escalante, Nunez Vargas, Trejos Flores, Carrillo, Elsa Orozco, and Madrigal Nieto

1958 Delegation
In this assembly, Costa Rica declared itself against the death penalty.

Delegates: Gonzalo Ortiz Martin, Raul Trejos Flores, Alfredo Vargas Fernandez, Hernan Zamora, Guido Fernandez, Eladio Trejos Flores, Manuel E. Rodriguez, Emilia Castro-Barish, and Ramiro Brenes Gutierrez

1959 Delegation
Delegates: Alfredo Vargas Fernandez, Gonzalo Ortiz Martin, Enrique Guier Saenz, Gonzalo Salazar Herrera, Raul Trejos Flores, Enrique Oller Zamora, Guido Sanchez Fernandez, Ramiro Brenes Gutierrez, Oscar Chavarria Pol, E. Castro de Barish

1960 Delegation
Delegates: Alfredo Vargas Fernandez, Gonzalo Ortiz Martin, Estela Quesada, Alfredo Fernandez Iglesias, Jose Francisco Benavides Robles, Javier Oreamuno, Raul Selva Herra, Rafael Iglesias Alvarez, E. Castro de Barish, Margarita de Macaya

1961 Delegation
Delegates: Gonzalo Ortiz Martin, Javier Oreamuno, Guillermo Valverde, Isabel de Ortiz Martin, E. Castro de Barish, Oscar Chavarria Pol, Alberto Pinto, Fabio Sanchez Castillo

1962 Delegation
Delegates: Daniel Oduber Quiros, Mario Gomez, Fernando Volio, Jose Luis Redondo, Rodolfo Lara Iraeta, Javier Oreamuno, Hernan Gonzalez Gutierrez, E. Castro de Barish, Luis F. Jimenez Mendez, Alonso Lara Thomas, Humberto Nigro Borbon

1963 Delegation
Delegates: E. Castro de Barish, Hernan Gonzalez Gutierrez, Lara Iraeta, Oduber Quiros, Javier Oreamuno, J.L. Redondo, Volio Jimenez

1964 Delegation
Delegates: Volio Jimenez, Castro Hernandez, Rev. F. Herrera, Oduber Quiros, Cristian Tattembach, J.L. Redondo, Pol-Vargas

1965 Delegation
Delegates: Oduber Quiros, Volio Jimenez, Castro Barish, Mario Gomez Calvo, JL Redondo, Rafael Benavides, Mercedes Valverde, Rev. Francisco Herrera, Raul Hess, R. Castro Silva, Julio Corvetti

1966 Delegation
Delegates: Castro Barish, Castro Silva, Gomez Calvo, Redondo, J.M. Aguirre, Herrera Mora, Montero Mora, J.J. Sobrado, Valverde Cooper

1967 Delegation
Delegates: Lara Bustamante, L.D. Tinoco, Castro de Barish, E. Jimenez

1968 Delegation
Delegates: Lara Bustamante, L.D. Tinoco, D. Chaverri, E. Jimenez, Castro de Barish

1969 Delegation
Delegates: Dobles Sanchez, Castro de Barish, E. Iglesias, Neil Neil, G. Serrano

1970 Delegation
Delegates: Gonzalo Facio, Luis Molina, Daniel Oduber, Guillermo Jimenez Ramirez, Jesus Fernandez Morales, E. Castro de Barish, Luis Castro Hernandez, Miguel Yamuni, Luis Bonilla, Manuel Emilio Montero y Jose Vega

1971 Delegation
Delegates: Jose Figueres, JL Molina, G. Facio, Castro de Barish, Castro-Hernandez, L. Bonilla

1972 Delegation
Delegates: G. Facio, Castro de Barish, Nunez Vargas, JL Molina, R. Carreras, R. Morales, E. Fonseca, G. Trejos, A. Montiel

1973 Delegation
Delegates: G. Facio, Castro de Barish, J.L. Molina, R. Morales, R. Paris Steffens, J.L. Redondo, F. Salazar, L.A. Varela, Benjamin Vargas

1974 Delegation
Delegates: G. Facio, Castro de Barish, Salazar Navarrete, L. Varela, B. Vargas, Freer Jimenez, F. Monge, V.H. Roman and F. del Castillo

1975 Delegation
Costa Rica was elected the Executive Director of the UN Special Fund.

Delegates: G. Facio, Castro de Barish, Nunez Vargas, M. Morales, F. Salazar Navarrete, Vargas Saborio

1976 Delegation
In this session, Ambassador Saborio was elected into the Contributions Committee. The themes treated by the Costa Rican delegates were: the violation of human rights in Chile, the problem of occupied Arab territories, the activities of the International Rights, the problem with the Panama Canal, general aspects of the Commission on Human Rights, the establishment of the Human Rights Council, and perspectives on the Global Convention on Racism and Racial Discrimination.

Delegates: G.J. Facio, E. Castro Barish, JL Redondo, JJ Chaverri, F. Salazar, Vargas Saborio, R. Ortega, President Daniel Oduber (Secretary-General of the General Assembly)

1977 Delegation
Delegates: Castro de Barish, M. Freer, V. Hernandez, Nazareth Incera, F. Fournier, M. Herrera, J.L. Redondo, Varela Quiros, Vargas Chacon, Ortiz Martin

1978 Delegation
Costa Rica was elected as the Vice-President of the General Assembly, and was also elected to the Committee on Programming and Coordination. Ambassador Piza was elected into the Special Political Committee. During this time, the President Rodrigo Carazo Odio addressed the General Assembly in its 11th session.

Delegates: Calderon Fournier, Piza Escalante, A. Antillon Salazar, Castro de Barish, J.L. Redondo, G. Ortiz Martin, A. Pinto, F. Fournier, Varela Quiros, L.D. Tinoco Castro, Vargas Chacon, E. Zeledon de Carazo

1979 Delegation
In this session, the Ambassador R. Piza was unanimously elected the President of the Credentials Committee, and Orietta Moya de Fraenkel was elected Acting Chairman of the same committee.

Delegates: Calderon Fournier, Piza Escalante, Niehaus Quesada, Castro de Barish

1980 Delegation
Costa Rica is again nominated as the Vice-President of the General Assembly, and Ambassador Piza Escalante continued to occupy the Presidency of the Credentials Committee. In addition, delegate Esquival Tovar is nominated as Vice-President of the Third Committee: Social, Humanitarian, and Cultural Affairs. President Rodrigo Carazo Odio addressed the Assembly.

Delegates: Piza Escalante, Niehaus Quesada, J.M. Alfaro, V. Perez, N. Incera, R. Daher, Castro de Barish, Esquivel Tovar, A.C. Hidalgo, Varela Quiros

1981 Delegation
Delegates: B. Niehaus, Castro de Barish, N. Incera, Echeverria Villafranca

1982 Delegation
Costa Rica was elected to be part of the Social and Economic Committee (ECOSOC).

Delegates: Volio Jimenez, J. Urbina, F. Zumbado, J. Munoz Mora, Castro de Barish

1983 Delegation
Delegates: C.J. Gutierrez, F. Zumbado, Castro de Barish, F. Salazar, J. Urbina, Ines Trejos

1984 Delegation
In this session, Costa Rica and other Central American countries proposed a plan of economic recuperation for the region.

Delegates: F. Zumbado, Castro de Barish, C.J. Gutierrez, F. Salazar, N. Jorge Urbina, Ines Trejos

1985 Delegation
Costa Rica was elected Vice-President of the General Assembly.

Delegates: F. Berrocal Soto, Castro de Barish, C.J. Gutierrez, Munoz Mora, N. Incera, J. Saenz C.

1986 Delegation
President Oscar Arias Sanchez addressed the General Assembly on the human rights situation in Central America.

Delegates: C.J. Gutierrez, Castro de Barish, A.J. Ortuno

1987 Delegation
President Arias addressed the General Assembly, again referring to the human rights situation in Central America.

Delegates: C.J. Gutierrez, Castro de Barish, N. Incera

1988 Delegation
In this session, Ambassador Segura was elected as the Chief of the Costa Rican Delegation.

Delegates: Madrigal Nieto, Rivera Bianchini, CJ Gutierrez, Castro de Barish, A. Chacon, V. Garron de Doryan, M. Castro Laurencich, I. Hermmann

1989 Delegation
In this session, Costa Rican President Arias was chosen to speak about the accomplishments of Central American countries.

Delegates: Madrigal Nieto, Rivera Bianchini, N. Morales, I. Hermann, C.J. Gutierrez, Castro de Barish, A. Chacon, N. Incera

1990 Delegation
In this session, President Calderon attended the World Summit of Heads of State and Government to ratify the Convention on the Rights of the Child.

Delegates: Niehaus Quesada, E. Odio Benito, Castro de Barish, Piza Rocafort, C. Tattenbach, Vargas de Zardoff, N. Incer, J.M. Borbon

1991 Delegation
Delegates: Niehaus Quesada, E. Odio Benito, Castro de Barish, Piza Rocafort, C. Tattenbach, Vargas de Zardoff, N. Incer, J.M. Borbon, N. Morales

1992 Delegation
Delegates: Niehaus Quesada, C. Tattembach, Castro de Barish, A.M. Rivera, J.M. Borbon

1993 Delegation
Delegates: Niehaus Quesada, Castro de Barish, C. Tattenbach, N. Incera, A.M. Rivera, M. Peralta, Vargas de Jesus

1994 Delegation
Delegates: F. Naranjo, Castro de Barish, F. Berrocal, S. Picado, V. Monge, L.G. Solis, R. Carreras, J. Rossi

1995 Delegation
Delegates: F. Naranjo, R. Carreras, F. Berrocal, E. Castro de Barish, M. Saenz, L.G. Solis

Membership in the Commission on Human Rights
Costa Rica was a member state of the Commission on Human Rights from 1964–67, 1975–77, 1980–88, 1992–94, 2001-2006.

References